Swati Maliwal (born 15 October 1984) is an Indian activist. She is the current Chairperson of Delhi Commission for Women. Before joining DCW, Maliwal worked as the advisor to the Chief Minister of Delhi on public grievances.

Maliwal was a core member of the Indian Against Corruption movement led by social activist Anna Hazare and Arvind Kejriwal. After the formation of the Arvind Kejriwal government in 2015, Maliwal was appointed the Chairperson of the Delhi Commission for Women.

Personal life 
Maliwal was born in Ghaziabad, Uttar Pradesh on 15 October 1984. She went to Amity International School and then received a bachelor's degree in Information Technology from the JSS Academy of Technical Education. She got a job at an MNC and left it to join an NGO called "Parivartan". Maliwal was married to Aam Aadmi Party leader Naveen Jaihind. They divorced in February 2020.

Political career 

Maliwal started her first term as Chairperson of Delhi Commission for Women in July 2015. At the time, she was the Aam Aadmi Party leader. Her tenure in the position was extended another three years in July 2018. She is the youngest person to hold the role of commissioner for women.

In 2018, she went on a 10-day hunger strike which started on 13 April. She had several demands, including the passage of an ordinance requiring the death penalty for individuals who rape children under age 12, recruiting police under United Nations standards and demanding accountability of the police. Maliwal published an open letter to Prime Minister Narendra Modi. Her strike took place during a series of protests surrounding two alleged rapes of girls ages 16 and 8.

References

Living people
1984 births
Place of birth missing (living people)
Indian women activists
Indian anti-corruption activists
Indian women's rights activists
People from Ghaziabad district, India
Aam Aadmi Party politicians from Delhi